is a former Japanese football player.

Career
After attending University of Tsukuba, Kohei Takayanagi signed for Iwaki FC. A wonderful 2017 season - concluded with 23 goals in just 9 games between league and Emperor's Cup - brought Takayanagi to Grulla Morioka for 2018 season, playing so his first pro-season.

Club statistics
Updated to 1 January 2019.

References

External links

Profile at J. League
Profile at Grulla Morioka

1994 births
Living people
University of Tsukuba alumni
People from Nisshin, Aichi
Association football people from Aichi Prefecture
Japanese footballers
J3 League players
Iwate Grulla Morioka players
Iwaki FC players
Association football forwards